In the Basement (Im Keller) is a 2014 Austrian documentary film directed by Ulrich Seidl about people and their obsessions, and what they do in their basements in their free time. It was part of the Out of Competition section at the 71st Venice International Film Festival.

Critical reception

Glass Magazine called the film "unflinching and unsettling" in its review. Guy Lodge wrote "this is an arm's-length exercise in observation, even in scenes of discomfiting intimacy" in his review for Variety.

References

External links

Austrian documentary films
2014 documentary films
Films directed by Ulrich Seidl
Documentary films about psychology